The relationship between science and the Catholic Church is a widely debated subject. Historically, the Catholic Church has been a patron of sciences. It has been prolific in the foundation and funding of schools, universities, and hospitals, and many clergy have been active in the sciences. Some historians of science such as Pierre Duhem credit medieval Catholic mathematicians and philosophers such as John Buridan, Nicole Oresme, and Roger Bacon as the founders of modern science. Duhem found "the mechanics and physics, of which modern times are justifiably proud, to proceed by an uninterrupted series of scarcely perceptible improvements from doctrines professed in the heart of the medieval schools." The conflict thesis and other critiques emphasize the historical or contemporary conflict between the Catholic Church and science, citing, in particular, the trial of Galileo as evidence. For its part, the Catholic Church teaches that science and the Christian faith are complementary, as can be seen from the Catechism of the Catholic Church which states in regards to faith and science: 
Though faith is above reason, there can never be any real discrepancy between faith and reason. Since the same God who reveals mysteries and infuses faith has bestowed the light of reason on the human mind, God cannot deny himself, nor can truth ever contradict truth. ... Consequently, methodical research in all branches of knowledge, provided it is carried out in a truly scientific manner and does not override moral laws, can never conflict with the faith, because the things of the world and the things of faith derive from the same God. The humble and persevering investigator of the secrets of nature is being led, as it were, by the hand of God despite himself, for it is God, the conserver of all things, who made them what they are.

Catholic scientists, both religious and lay, have led scientific discovery in many fields.  From ancient times, Christian emphasis on practical charity gave rise to the development of systematic nursing and hospitals and the Church remains the single largest private provider of medical care and research facilities in the world.  Following the Fall of Rome, monasteries and convents remained bastions of scholarship in Western Europe and clergymen were the leading scholars of the age – studying nature, mathematics, and the motion of the stars (largely for religious purposes).  During the Middle Ages, the Church founded Europe's first universities, producing scholars like Robert Grosseteste, Albert the Great, Roger Bacon, and Thomas Aquinas, who helped establish the scientific method.

During this period, the Church was also a major patron of engineering for the construction of elaborate cathedrals. Since the Renaissance, Catholic scientists have been credited as fathers of a diverse range of scientific fields: Nicolaus Copernicus (1473-1543) pioneered heliocentrism, René Descartes (1596-1650) father of analytical geometry and co-founder of modern philosophy, Jean-Baptiste Lamarck (1744-1829) prefigured the theory of evolution with Lamarckism, Friar Gregor Mendel (1822-1884) pioneered genetics, and Fr Georges Lemaître (1894-1966) proposed the Big Bang cosmological model.  The Jesuits have been particularly active, notably in astronomy. Church patronage of sciences continues through institutions like the Pontifical Academy of Sciences (a successor to the Accademia dei Lincei of 1603) and Vatican Observatory (a successor to the Gregorian Observatory of 1580).

The theory of conflict between science and the Church
This view of the Church as a patron of sciences is contested by some, who speak either of a historically varied relationship which has shifted, from active and even singular support to bitter clashes (with accusations of heresy) – or of an enduring intellectual conflict between religion and science.  Enlightenment philosophers such as Voltaire were famously dismissive of the achievements of the Middle Ages. In the 19th century, the "conflict thesis" emerged to propose an intrinsic conflict or conflicts between the Church and science. The original historical usage of the term asserted that the Church has been in perpetual opposition to science. Later uses of the term denote the Church's epistemological opposition to science. The thesis interprets the relationship between the Church and science as inevitably leading to public hostility when religion aggressively challenges new scientific ideas as in the Galileo Affair. An alternative criticism is that the Church opposed particular scientific discoveries that it felt challenged its authority and power – particularly through the Reformation and on through the Enlightenment. This thesis shifts the emphasis away from the perception of the fundamental incompatibility of religion per se and science-in-general to a critique of the structural reasons for the resistance of the Church as a political organization.

The Church itself rejects the notion of innate conflict. The Vatican Council (1869/70) declared that "Faith and reason are of mutual help to each other." The Catholic Encyclopedia of 1912 proffers that "The conflicts between science and the Church are not real", and states that belief in such conflicts are predicated on false assumptions. Pope John Paul II summarised the Catholic view of the relationship between faith and reason in the encyclical Fides et Ratio, saying that "faith and reason are like two wings on which the human spirit rises to the contemplation of truth; and God has placed in the human heart a desire to know the truth – in a word, to know himself – so that, by knowing and loving God, men and women may also come to the fullness of truth about themselves." The present Papal astronomer Brother Guy Consolmagno describes science as an "act of worship" and as "a way of getting intimate with the Creator."

Some leading Catholic scientists
Scientific fields with important foundational contributions from Catholic scientists include: physics (Galileo) despite his trial and conviction in 1633 for publishing a treatise on his observation that the earth revolves around the sun, which banned his writings and made him spend the remainder of his life under house arrest, acoustics (Mersenne), mineralogy (Agricola), modern chemistry (Lavoisier), modern anatomy (Vesalius), stratigraphy (Steno), bacteriology (Kircher and Pasteur), genetics (Mendel), analytical geometry (Descartes), heliocentric cosmology (Copernicus), atomic theory (Boscovich), and the Big Bang Theory on the origins of the universe (Lemaître). Jesuits devised modern lunar nomenclature and stellar classification and some 35 craters of the moon are named after Jesuits, among whose great scientific polymaths were Francesco Grimaldi and Giambattista Riccioli. The Jesuits also introduced Western science to India and China and translated local texts to be sent to Europe for study. Missionaries contributed significantly to the fields of anthropology, zoology, and botany during Europe's Age of Discovery.

Definitions of science
Differing analyses of the Catholic relationship to science may arise from definitional variance. While secular philosophers consider "science" in the restricted sense of natural science, in the past theologians tended to view science in a very broad sense as given by Aristotle's definition that science is the sure and evident knowledge obtained from demonstrations.  In this sense, science comprises the entire curriculum of university studies, and the Church has claimed authority in matters of doctrine and teaching of science. With the gradual secularisation of the West, the influence of the Church over scientific research has gradually faded.

History

Early Middle Ages

After the Fall of Rome, while an increasingly Hellenized Roman Empire and Christian religion endured as the Byzantine Empire in the East, the study of nature endured in monastic communities in the West.  On the fringes of western Europe, where the Roman tradition had not made a strong imprint, monks engaged in the study of Latin as a foreign language, and actively investigated the traditions of Roman learning. Ireland's most learned monks even retained knowledge of Greek. Irish missionaries like Colombanus later founded monasteries in continental Europe, which went on to create libraries and become centers of scholarship.

The leading scholars of the Early Middle Ages were clergymen, for whom the study of nature was but a small part of their scholarly interest.  They lived in an atmosphere which provided opportunity and motives for the study of aspects of nature.  Some of this study was carried out for explicitly religious reasons.  The need for monks to determine the proper time to pray led them to study the motion of the stars; the need to compute the date of Easter led them to study and teach rudimentary mathematics and the motions of the Sun and Moon.  Modern readers may find it disconcerting that sometimes the same works discuss both the technical details of natural phenomena and their symbolic significance. In astronomical observation, Bede of Jarrow described two comets over England, and wrote that the "fiery torches" of AD 729 struck terror in all who saw them – for comets were heralds of bad news.

Among these clerical scholars was Bishop Isidore of Seville who wrote a comprehensive encyclopedia of natural knowledge, the monk Bede of Jarrow who wrote treatises on The Reckoning of Time and The Nature of Things, Alcuin of York, abbot of the Abbey of Marmoutier, who advised Charlemagne on scientific matters, and Rabanus Maurus, Archbishop of Mainz and one of the most prominent teachers of the Carolingian Age, who, Like Bede, wrote treatises on computus and On the Nature of Things.  Abbot Ælfric of Eynsham, who is known mostly for his Old English homilies, wrote a book on the astronomical time reckoning in Old English based on the writings of Bede. Abbo of Fleury wrote astronomical discussions of timekeeping and of the celestial spheres for his students, teaching for a while in England where he influenced the work of Byrhtferth of Ramsey, who wrote a Manual in Old English to discuss timekeeping and the natural and mystical significance of numbers.

Later Middle Ages

Foundation of universities
In the early Middle Ages, Cathedral schools developed as centers of education, evolving into the medieval universities which were the springboard of many of Western Europe's later achievements. During the High Middle Ages, Chartres Cathedral operated the famous and influential Chartres Cathedral School. Among the great early Catholic universities were Bologna University (1088); Paris University (c 1150); Oxford University (1167); Salerno University (1173); University of Vicenza (1204); Cambridge University (1209); Salamanca University (1218-1219); Padua University (1222); Naples University (1224); and Vercelli University (1228).

Using church Latin as a lingua franca, the medieval universities across Western Europe produced a great variety of scholars and natural philosophers, including Robert Grosseteste of the University of Oxford, an early expositor of a systematic method of scientific experimentation, and Saint Albert the Great, a pioneer of biological field research. By the mid-15th century, prior to the Reformation, Catholic Europe had some 50 universities.

Condemnations of 1210-1277

The Condemnations of 1210-1277 were enacted at the medieval University of Paris to restrict certain teachings as being heretical. These included a number of medieval theological teachings, but most importantly the physical treatises of Aristotle. The investigations of these teachings were conducted by the Bishops of Paris. The Condemnations of 1277 are traditionally linked to an investigation requested by Pope John XXI, although whether he actually supported drawing up a list of condemnations is unclear.

Approximately sixteen lists of censured theses were issued by the University of Paris during the 13th and 14th centuries. Most of these lists of propositions were put together into systematic collections of prohibited articles.

Mathematics, engineering and architecture
According to art historian Kenneth Clark, "to medieval man, geometry was a divine activity. God was the great geometer, and this concept inspired the architect." Monumental cathedrals such as that of Chartres appear to evidence a complex understanding of mathematics. The Church has invested greatly in engineering and architecture and founded a number of architectural genres – including Byzantine, Romanesque, Gothic, High Renaissance, and Baroque.

Roman Inquisition 
In the Middle Ages of the Roman Church, Pope Paul III (1468-1549) initiated the Congregation of the Roman Inquisition in 1542, which is also known as the Holy Office. A large expansion of Protestantism began to spread all throughout Italy, which triggered Pope Paul III to act against it. He would be the first to create proactive reforms for the sake of Roman Catholicism. Evidently the reforms would be strict rulings against foreign ideologies that would fall outside of their religious beliefs. The Inquisition would soon be under the control of Pope Sixtus V in 1588.

View of Outsiders 

The Roman society was not very fond of outside beliefs. They would keep their borders up to religious foreigners as they felt other practices would influence and change their sacred Catholicism religion. They were also against witchcraft as such practices were seen in 1484 where Pope Innocent stated it was an act of going against the church. Any ideologies that was outside of their norm beliefs was seen as a threat and needed to be corrected even if it was through torture.

Inquisition Tactics and Practices 

Pope Sixtus V put forth 15 congregations. The inquisition would imprison anyone who was seen as a threat towards the Catholic Church or placed onto house arrest. They kept a tight security and denied any other religious foreigners from coming inside their regions. Papal policies were implemented to stop foreigners from showing their practices to the public. The Index of Forbidden Books was used to prevent people from doing magic and to suppress books deemed heretical, politically disruptive, or threatening to public morals. To stray away from this would allow for one to not be "infected". Punishment was acceptable and torture tactics were used in order for one to confess their sins.

The Fall of the Inquisition 

In the 18th century, witchcraft and other groups became less of a threat to the Catholic Church. The focus moved to conversos as the population grew. Conversos mainly impacted the Spanish Inquisition. Furthermore, by the 19th century, the Roman Inquisition was very minimal, however, some ideologies were still seen in 1965.

Scientific Revolution and the Church 
The Scientific Revolution began in 1543 with Nicholas Copernicus and his heliocentric theory and is defined as the beginning of a dramatic shift in thought and belief towards scientific theory. The Scientific Revolution began in Western Europe, where the Catholic Church had the strongest holding. It is believed that the Scientific Revolution began in Western Europe because of the freedom to pursue other ideas provided by most European Universities and which go against Church authorities. Western Europe was also a central 'melting pot' for foreign knowledge and cultural beliefs including ancient Chinese math, Islamic philosophy, and Arabic astrology. Posed by author Peter Dear, the revolution can be thought of in two parts: the Scientific Renaissance and the revolution. The renaissance is considered the actual rebirth of the ideas, where mathematics, philosophy, astronomy, and physics were all being rediscovered in a sense. Following this rediscovery, people began to question the ideas of the church (which could be considered antique). Dear also references the fact that when historians study the relationship between scientists and the Church, they are not taking the standpoint that either view is true, instead they look at it the reasons they believed their side and then "Find out; truth or falsity are determined by arguments and it is the arguments that can be studied historically."

The Scientific Revolution and its challenging of the Church's ideas were followed by the Period of Enlightenment where people not only question the Church's ideas but also began to question their authority. The central theme of this period is that human society "could be changed and improved by human action guided by reason" as stated by Marquis de Condorcet. These periods of changing thought eventually led to the prominent holdings of liberty, progress, tolerance, and scientific theories within the Church.

Development of Modern Science

Geology
Georgius Agricola (1494-1555), is considered the founder of geology and "Father of Mineralogy". He made important contributions which paved the way for systematic study of the earth. A German Catholic who retained his faith through the Reformation, he also wrote on patristics (early church history). In 1546, he wrote De Ortu et Causis Subterraneorum which was the first book written on physical geology, and De Natura Fossilium (On the Nature of Fossils) which described fossils and minerals.

Nicolas Steno (1638-1686) is a Catholic convert who served as a bishop after making a series of important anatomical and geological innovations. His studies of the formation of rock layers and fossils was of vital significance to the development of modern geology and continue to be used today. He established the theoretical basis for stratigraphy. Originally a Lutheran, he did anatomical work in the Netherlands but moved to Catholic Italy and, in 1667, converted. Denied office in the Protestant north, he continued his medical and geological studies, but in 1675 became a priest and soon after was appointed a bishop, writing 16 major theological works.

Astronomy 

The Catholic Church's longstanding interest and investment in astronomy prior to the scientific revolution fueled developments in related fields and set the Church up to become a nexus of astronomical study through the scientific revolution and into the early modern period in spite of the flagrant conflicts between Copernican and church doctrine.

The Church's interest in astronomy stemmed from issues surrounding the determination of the date for Easter, which was originally tied to the Hebrew lunisolar calendar. In the 4th century, due to perceived problems with the Hebrew calendar's leap month system, the Council of Nicaea prescribed that Easter would fall on the first Sunday following the first full moon after the vernal equinox. Thus, it became necessary that the Church have the capacity to predict the date of Easter with enough accuracy and forewarning to allow both for sufficient time to prepare for the feast as well as ensure the universal celebration of the holy day across all of the Church's dominion – a daunting logistical feat. This necessity fueled constant innovation and refinement of astronomical practice as the solar and lunar years diverge over centuries.

The Church's dedication to ever-increasingly accurate astronomy led to developments in ancillary disciplines. In the 12th century, the church helped re-popularize and disseminate ancient Greek ideas and mathematical techniques across Europe by sponsoring the translation of newly available Arabic-language version of Greek texts into Latin. This was done in large part to aid in astronomical study. In the late 16th century, the Church encouraged the inclusion of pinhole cameras into the construction of churches. Pinhole cameras are among the best tools for measuring the time between solstices. The transformation of churches into solar observatories encouraged innovations in engineering, architecture, and construction, and fueled the careers of astronomers like Cassini.

By the 16th century, the date of the vernal equinox on the Julian calendar had receded from March 25 to March 11. The Council of Trent in 1562 authorized the pope to deal with calendar reform. The resulting Gregorian calendar is the internationally accepted civil calendar used throughout the world today. It was introduced by Pope Gregory XIII, after whom the calendar was named, by a decree signed on 24 February 1582.

When the Church sent Jesuit missionaries to spread the gospel in China in the 16th and 17th centuries, they were accepted into and valued by the Chinese Imperial court because of their astronomical and mathematical expertise. This channel of communication for dialog between China and Europe allowed not only for the propagation of European sciences into China but also the flow of Chinese technologies and ideas back to Europe. The introduction of Chinese ideas into European popular consciousness through this Jesuit channel is credited by modern historians with adding fuel to the scientific revolution and enlightenment. In many cases, Jesuits were specifically dispatched to China with a list of topics on which to collect information.

In 1789, the Vatican Observatory opened. It was moved to Castel Gandolfo in the 1930s and the Vatican Advanced Technology Telescope began observing in Arizona, USA, in 1995.

Copernicus

Nicolaus Copernicus was a Renaissance astronomer and Catholic canon who was the first person to formulate a comprehensive heliocentric cosmology which displaced the Earth from the center of the universe.

In 1533, Johann Albrecht Widmannstetter delivered a series of lectures in Rome outlining Copernicus' theory. Pope Clement VII and several Catholic cardinals heard the lectures and were interested in the theory. On 1 November 1536, Nikolaus von Schönberg, Archbishop of Capua and since the previous year a cardinal, wrote to Copernicus from Rome:

By then Copernicus' work was nearing its definitive form, and rumors about his theory had reached educated people all over Europe. Despite urgings from many quarters, Copernicus delayed publication of his book, perhaps from fear of criticism – a fear delicately expressed in the subsequent dedication of his masterpiece to Pope Paul III. Scholars disagree on whether Copernicus' concern was limited to possible astronomical and philosophical objections, or whether he was also concerned about religious objections.

At original publication, Copernicus' epoch-making book caused only mild controversy, and provoked no fierce sermons about contradicting Holy Scripture. It was only three years later, in 1546, that a Dominican, Giovanni Maria Tolosani, denounced the theory in an appendix to a work defending the absolute truth of Scripture. He also noted that the Master of the Sacred Palace (i.e., the Catholic Church's chief censor), Bartolomeo Spina, a friend and fellow Dominican, had planned to condemn De revolutionibus but had been prevented from doing so by his illness and death.

Galileo Galilei

Galileo Galilei was a Catholic scientist of the Reformation period whose support for Copernican heliocentrism was suppressed by the Inquisition. He is considered one of the inventors of modern science. Along with fellow Catholic scientist Copernicus, Galileo was among those who overturned the notion of geocentrism. Protestant and atheist critics of Catholicism's relationship to science have placed great emphasis on the Galileo affair. Galileo was ordered not to support Copernican theory in 1616, but in 1632, after receiving permission from a new Pope (Urban VIII) to address the subject indirectly through a dialogue, he fell foul of the Pontiff by treating the Church's views unfavorably, assigning them to a character named Simplicio— suspiciously similar to the Italian word for "simple." The Inquisition found him guilty of defending Copernican theory as a probability, "vehemently suspect of heresy," demanded him to recant his views and placed him under house arrest for the remainder of his life.

Federico Cesi created the Accademia dei Lincei in 1603 as an Italian science academy, of which Galileo became a member. Galileo's championing of Copernicanism was controversial within his lifetime, when a large majority of philosophers and astronomers still subscribed to the geocentric view. Galileo gained wide support for his theories outside the universities by writing in Italian, rather than academic Latin. In response, the Aristotelian professors of the universities formed a united effort to convince the Church to ban Copernicanism.

Initially a beneficiary of Church patronage of astronomy, Galileo rose to prominence with the publication of Sidereus Nuncius, which included astronomical observations made possible by the 1608 invention of the telescope. He was feted in Rome, honoured by the Jesuits of the Roman College, and received by Pope Paul V and Church dignitaries. Galileo began to dismiss geocentrism and emerging alternative theories like that of Tycho Brahe. Proponents of these alternatives began to work against Galileo and claim a contradiction between the Bible and his theories. Galileo rejected the accusation – quoting Cardinal Baronius: "The Holy Ghost intended to teach us how to go to heaven, not how the heavens go." He invited the Church to follow established practice and reinterpret Scripture in light of the new scientific discoveries. The leading Jesuit Theologian Cardinal Robert Bellarmine agreed this would be an appropriate response to a true demonstration that the sun was at the center of the universe, but cautioned that the existing materials upon which Galileo relied did not yet constitute an established truth.

Galileo's career coincided with the reaction of the Catholic Church to the Protestant Reformation, in which the Catholic Church struggled for authority in Europe, following the emergence of the Protestant Churches and nations of Northern Europe. Pope Paul III created the Roman and Universal Inquisition to stop the spread of "heretical depravity" throughout the Christian world. From 1571, the institution had jurisdiction over books and created the Index of Prohibited Books. Rome established the Sacred Congregation for the Propagation of the Faith in 1622. Science historian Jacob Bronowski wrote that "Catholics and Protestants were embattled in what we should now call a Cold War. ...The Church was a great temporal power, and in that bitter time it was fighting a political crusade in which all means were justified by the end." In this climate, Cardinal Bellarmine, himself a distinguished scholar, instigated inquiries against Galileo as early as 1613.

After 1610, when Galileo began publicly supporting the heliocentric view which placed the Sun at the center of the universe, he met with bitter opposition from some philosophers and clerics, and two of the latter eventually denounced him to the Roman Inquisition early in 1615. Galileo defended his theories through the long-established Catholic understanding of Scripture, that the Bible was not intended to expound scientific theory and where it conflicted with common sense, should be read as allegory. Although he was cleared of any offense at that time, the Catholic Church declared heliocentrism as "false and contrary to Scripture" in February 1616, and Galileo was warned to abandon his support for it, which he promised to do.

In March 1616, the Church's Congregation of the Index issued a decree suspending De revolutionibus until it could be "corrected", because the supposedly Pythagorean doctrine that the Earth moves and the Sun does not was "false and altogether opposed to Holy Scripture." The same decree also prohibited any work that defended the mobility of the Earth or the immobility of the Sun, or that attempted to reconcile these assertions with Scripture. On the orders of Pope Paul V, Cardinal Bellarmine gave Galileo notice the decree was about to be issued, and warned him he could not "hold or defend" Copernican beliefs. The corrections to De revolutionibus, which omitted or altered nine sentences, were issued four years later, in 1620.

In 1623, Galileo's friend Maffeo Barberini was elected as Pope Urban VIII. Urban VIII was an intellectual and patron of the arts and architecture, who had written poetry as a young man in praise of Galileo's astronomical writings. Galileo met with the new Pope, hoping to persuade him to lift the 1616 ban. Instead he received permission to write a book on Aristotelian and Copernican theories, provided he did not take sides. The book, Dialogue Concerning the Two Chief World Systems, was passed by the censors and was well-received across Europe, but ultimately offended Urban VIII, whose own arguments were put into the mouth of the buffoon-like Simplicio in the dialogue. The Preparatory Commission for the trial of Galileo noted that the Pope's stated belief that it would be extravagant boldness to limit the power and wisdom of God to an individual's particular conjecture was put "into the mouth of a fool" in Galileo's text.

Galileo was summoned to Rome to be tried by the Inquisition in 1633. According to Bronowski, Galileo's accusers relied on a forged document purporting to have, in 1616, forbidden Galileo from in "any way whatsoever" teaching theories of Copernicus, and thus could find him guilty of dishonestly tricking the censors and therefore ban his book without addressing the issues of substance relating to Copernicus found within it. Galileo was found "vehemently suspect of heresy" for "following the position of Copernicus, which is contrary to the true sense and authority of Holy Scripture." Galileo was forced to recant, and spend the rest of his life under house arrest. Galileo remained a practicing Catholic and during his house arrest wrote his most influential work Two New Sciences – a book that was smuggled to the Protestant part of Holland to be published.

The Catholic Church's 1758 Index of Prohibited Books omitted the general prohibition of works defending heliocentrism, but retained the specific prohibitions of the original uncensored versions of De revolutionibus and Galileo's Dialogue Concerning the Two Chief World Systems. Those prohibitions were finally dropped from the 1835 Index.

The Inquisition's ban on reprinting Galileo's works was lifted in 1718 when permission was granted to publish an edition of his works (excluding the condemned Dialogue) in Florence. In 1741 Pope Benedict XIV authorized the publication of an edition of Galileo's complete scientific works which included a mildly censored version of the Dialogue. In 1758 the general prohibition against works advocating heliocentrism was removed from the Index of prohibited books, although the specific ban on uncensored versions of the Dialogue and Copernicus's De Revolutionibus remained. All traces of official opposition to heliocentrism by the Church disappeared in 1835 when these works were finally dropped from the Index.

Pope Urban VIII refused Galileo a stately burial upon his death, though later his bones were interred under a monument at the Church of Santa Croce in Florence. In 1980, Pope John Paul II ordered a re-examination of the evidence against Galileo and formally acquitted him in 1992.

Modern view on Galileo
In 1939 Pope Pius XII, in his first speech to the Pontifical Academy of Sciences, within a few months of his election to the papacy, described Galileo as being among the "most audacious heroes of research ... not afraid of the stumbling blocks and the risks on the way, nor fearful of the funereal monuments." His close advisor of 40 years Professor Robert Leiber wrote: "Pius XII was very careful not to close any doors (to science) prematurely. He was energetic on this point and regretted that in the case of Galileo."

On 15 February 1990, in a speech delivered at the Sapienza University of Rome, Cardinal Ratzinger (later Pope Benedict XVI) cited some current views on the Galileo affair as forming what he called "a symptomatic case that permits us to see how deep the self-doubt of the modern age, of science and technology, goes today." Some of the views he cited were those of the philosopher Paul Feyerabend, whom he quoted as saying: “The Church at the time of Galileo kept much more closely to reason than did Galileo himself, and she took into consideration the ethical and social consequences of Galileo's teaching too. Her verdict against Galileo was rational and just and the revision of this verdict can be justified only on the grounds of what is politically opportune.” The Cardinal did not indicate whether he agreed or disagreed with Feyerabend's assertions. He did, however, say: "It would be foolish to construct an impulsive apologetic on the basis of such views."

On 31 October 1992, Pope John Paul II expressed regret for how the Galileo affair was handled, and issued a declaration acknowledging the errors committed by the Church tribunal that judged the scientific positions of Galileo Galilei; this was the result of a study conducted by the Pontifical Council for Culture. In March 2008 the Vatican proposed to complete its rehabilitation of Galileo by erecting a statue of him inside the Vatican walls. In December of the same year, during events to mark the 400th anniversary of Galileo's earliest telescopic observations, Pope Benedict XVI praised his contributions to astronomy.

Modern astronomers

Brother Guy Consolmagno, a Jesuit, became the first religious brother to be awarded the American Astronomical Society's Carl Sagan Medal for Excellence in Public Communication in Planetary Science in 2014. The judges noted his six books, and nominated his 'Turn Left At Orion'  as having had an "enormous impact on the amateur astronomy community, engendering public support for astronomy." They described Consolmagno as "the voice of the juxtaposition of planetary science and astronomy with Christian belief, a rational spokesperson who can convey exceptionally well how religion and science can co-exist for believers." Consolmagno describes science as an "act of worship, ... a way of getting close to creation, to really getting intimate with creation, and it's a way of getting intimate with the creator."

Gessner

Conrad Gessner's zoological work, Historiae animalium, which appeared in 4 volumes and was published between 1551 and 1588. Under Pope Paul IV, it was added to the Roman Catholic Church's list of prohibited books as Gessner was a Protestant. He still maintained friendship with Catholics regardless of the religious animosities between Catholics and Protestants at that time. Gaining support for his work, Catholic booksellers in Venice protested the ban on Gessner's books but it was later on allowed for selling once it was revised and "freed" from doctrines contrary to the Catholic faith.

Evolution

In the years since the publication of Charles Darwin's On the Origin of Species in 1859, the position of the Catholic Church on the theory of evolution has slowly been refined. For about 100 years there was no authoritative pronouncement on the subject, though local church figures took on more prominent sides. In 1961, seven years after Francis Crick discovered the structure of DNA, Christian Henry Morris and John C. Witcomb published The Genesis Flood, which argued that there is scientific support for the bible creation story. In October 1996, Pope John Paul II outlined the Catholic view of evolution to the Pontifical Academy of Sciences, saying that the Church holds that evolution is "more than a hypothesis," it is a well-accepted theory of science and that the human body evolved according to natural processes, while the human soul is the creation of God. This updated an earlier pronouncement by Pope Pius XII in the 1950 encyclical Humani generis that accepted evolution as a possibility (as opposed to a probability) and a legitimate field of study to investigate the origins of the human body – though it was stressed that "the Catholic faith obliges us to hold that souls are immediately created by God." In contrast with Protestant literalist objections, Catholic issues with evolutionary theory have had little to do with maintaining the literalism of the account in the Book of Genesis, and have always been concerned with the question of how man came to have a soul.

Catholic scientists contributed to the development of evolutionary theory. Among the foremost Catholic contributors to the development of the modern understanding of evolution was the Jesuit-educated Frenchman Jean-Baptiste Lamarck (1744-1829) and the Augustinian monk Gregor Mendel (1822-1884).  Lamarck developed Lamarckism, the first coherent theory of evolution, proposing in Philosophie Zoologique (1809) and other works his theory of the transmutation of species and drawing a genealogical tree to show the genetic connection of organisms. Mendel discovered the basis of genetics following long study of the inherited characteristics of pea plants, although his paper Experiments on Plant Hybridization, published in 1866, was famously overlooked until the start of the next century. The work of Catholic scientists like the Danish Bishop Nicolas Steno helped establish the science of geology, leading to modern scientific measurements of the age of the earth. The Church accepts modern geological theories on such matters and the authenticity of the fossil record. Papal pronouncements, along with commentaries by cardinals, indicate the Church is aware of the general findings of scientists on the gradual appearance of life. The Church's stance is that the temporal appearance of life has been guided by God.

Modern Creationism has had little Catholic support. In the 1950s, the Church's position was one of neutrality; by the late 20th century its position evolved to one of general acceptance of evolution. , the Church's official position is a fairly non-specific example of theistic evolution. This states that faith and scientific findings regarding human evolution are not in conflict, though humans are regarded as a special creation, and that the existence of God is required to explain both monogenism and the spiritual component of human origins.  No infallible declarations by the Pope or an Ecumenical Council have ever been made.

There have been several organizations composed of Catholic laity and clergy that have advocated positions both supporting and opposing evolution. For example:
 The Kolbe Center for the Study of Creation operates out of Mt. Jackson, Virginia, and is a Catholic lay apostolate promoting creationism.
 The Faith Movement was founded by Catholic Fr. Edward Holloway in Surrey, England.  His book Catholicism: a new synthesis "argues from Evolution as a fact, that the whole process would be impossible without the existence of the Supreme Mind we call God."
 Daylight Origins Society  was founded in 1971 by John G. Campbell (d.1983) as the "Counter Evolution Group". Its goal is "to inform Catholics and others of the scientific evidence supporting Special Creation as opposed to Evolution, and that the true discoveries of Science are in conformity with Catholic doctrines." It publishes the "Daylight" newsletter.

As in other countries, Catholic schools in the United States teach evolution as part of their science curriculum. They teach the fact that evolution occurs and the modern evolutionary synthesis, which is the scientific theory that explains how evolution occurs. This is the same evolution curriculum that secular schools teach.  Bishop DiLorenzo of Richmond, chair of the Committee on Science and Human Values, said in a December 2004 letter sent to all U.S. bishops: "Catholic schools should continue teaching evolution as a scientific theory backed by convincing evidence. At the same time, Catholic parents whose children are in public schools should ensure that their children are also receiving appropriate catechesis at home and in the parish on God as Creator. Students should be able to leave their biology classes, and their courses in religious instruction, with an integrated understanding of the means God chose to make us who we are."

Genetics

Gregor Mendel was an Austrian scientist and Augustinian friar who began experimenting with peas around 1856. Observing the processes of pollination at his monastery in what is now the Czech Republic, Mendel studied and developed theories about the field of science now called genetics. Mendel published his results in 1866 in the Journal of the Brno Natural History Society. The paper was not widely read nor understood, and soon after its publication Mendel was elected abbot of his monastery. He continued experimenting with bees but his work went unrecognized until various scientists resurrected his theories around 1900, after his death. Mendel had joined the Brno Augustinian Monastery in 1843, but also trained as a scientist at the Olmutz Philosophical Institute and the University of Vienna. The Brno Monastery was a center of scholarship, with an extensive library and a tradition of scientific research.

Where Charles Darwin's theories suggested a mechanism for improvement of species over generations, Mendel's observations explained how new species could emerge. Though Darwin and Mendel never collaborated, they were aware of each other's work (Darwin read a paper by Wilhelm Olbers Focke which extensively referenced Mendel). Bill Bryson wrote that "without realizing it, Darwin and Mendel laid the groundwork for all of the life sciences in the twentieth century. Darwin saw that all living things are connected, that ultimately they trace their ancestry to a single, common source; Mendel's work provided the mechanism to explain how that could happen."  Biologist J. B. S. Haldane and others brought together the principles of Mendelian inheritance with Darwinian principles of evolution to form the field of genetics known as Modern evolutionary synthesis.

"Big Bang" Theory for early development of the universe

The Big Bang model, or theory, is now the prevailing cosmological theory of the early development of the universe and was first proposed by Belgian priest Georges Lemaître, astronomer and professor of physics at the Catholic University of Leuven, with a Ph.D. from MIT. Lemaître was a pioneer in applying Albert Einstein's theory of general relativity to cosmology. Bill Bryson wrote that the idea was decades ahead of its time and that Lemaître was the first to bring together Einstein's theory of relativity with Edwin Hubble's cosmological observations, combining them in his own "fire-works theory". Lemaître theorized in the 1920s that the universe began as a geometrical point which he called a "primeval atom", which exploded out and has been moving apart ever since. The idea became established theory only decades later with the discovery of cosmic background radiation by American scientists.

Sponsorship of scientific research

In ancient times, the Church supported medical research as an aid to Christian charity. The Church supported the development of modern science and scientific research by founding some of Europe's first universities in the Middle Ages. Historian Lawrence M. Principe writes that "it is clear from the historical record that the Catholic church has been probably the largest single and longest-term patron of science in history, that many contributors to the Scientific Revolution were themselves Catholic, and that several Catholic institutions and perspectives were key influences upon the rise of modern science." The field of astronomy is a prime example of the Church's commitment to science. J.L. Heilbronn in his book The Sun in the Church: Cathedrals as Solar Observatories writes that "the Roman Catholic Church gave more financial aid and support to the study of astronomy for over six centuries, from the recovery of ancient learning during the late Middle Ages into the Enlightenment, than any other, and, probably, all other, institutions."

Scientific support continues through the present day. The Pontifical Academy of Sciences was founded in 1936 by Pope Pius XI to promote the progress of the mathematical, physical, and natural sciences and the study of related epistemological problems. The academy holds a membership roster of the most respected names of contemporary science, many of them Nobel laureates. Also worth noting is the Vatican Observatory, an astronomical research and educational institution supported by the Holy See.

In his 1996 encyclical Fides et Ratio, Pope John Paul II wrote that "faith and reason are like two wings on which the human spirit rises to the contemplation of truth." Pope Benedict XVI re-emphasized the importance of reason in his famous 2006 address at Regensburg. But the emphasis on reason is not a recent development in the Church's history. In the first few centuries of the Church, the Church Fathers appropriated the best of Greek philosophy in defense of the faith. This appropriation culminated in the 13th-century writings of Thomas Aquinas, whose synthesis of faith and reason has influenced Catholic thought for eight centuries. Because of this synthesis, many historians of science trace the foundations of modern science to the 13th century. These writers include Edward Grant, James Hannam, and Pierre Duhem.

The Catholic Church as a Strategic and Careful Patron of Science 
The relationship between the Catholic church and science has been largely supportive in spite of the myth of conflict stemming from discomfort with divergence from a Biblical geocentric model of cosmology to a heliocentric one. The church and its Jesuit missionaries not only studied subjects such as astronomy, physics and math, they exchanged information with others such as the Chinese across the world. In 1616, the Qualifiers of the Holy Office formally disavowed heliocentric theory. However, when they needed assistance with a problematic Ecclesiastical calendar, they solicited the assistance of astronomers who inadvertently proved the validity of it. Two developments made the confirmation possible: the more accurate measurements of the sun and the moon, and the astronomical community's understanding of how to use language that was vague enough to avoid direct conflict with church doctrine. Words in Biblical scripture left some room for interpretation and when there were conflicts between the physical and the scriptural, both the church and the scientists engaged in exercises of hermeneutical accommodation.

Example of Church Sponsorship of Astronomical Research-Ecclesiastical Calendaring 
One of the primary reasons that the church was so supportive of astronomical research was that the church needed astronomers to assist in resolving issues with the calendar—specifically in establishing a date for Easter. In 325 A.D., the Catholic theologians comprising the Council of Nicaea, set the date of Easter as the first Sunday after the first full moon of the vernal equinox where the vernal equinox was the point of equal daylight and darkness.  The challenge in using astronomical observations for a religious celebration spanning great distances across the globe was that date was inconsistent and subject to errors in accuracy of observations. Beyond the challenge of Easter was the fact that the calendar was used for business that included payment schedules, etc. thus creating economic consequences every time days were removed for realignment purposes. By the sixth century, there was papal pressure to create a system for designating the date of Easter that was both accurate and consistent across the world. The church recognized that there had been a drift and that the date of Easter no longer seemed to align with heaven which created an urgent need to understand the movement of the sun and earth so that the calendar conflicts could be resolved. After reviewing the data from Aristotle to Ptolemy, they recognized that the problem centered on the period between successive Spring equinoxes. In 1514, Pope Leo X commissioned Dutch astronomer Paul of Middleburg to identify a resolution. Paul favored resetting the date of the vernal equinox to March 10 rather than eliminating days to correct the drift but the changes were not made. Copernicus, a contemporary of Paul, attributed the failure to inaccuracies in measurements of the sun and moon and he focused his attention on collecting more accurate data.

Accurate data about the vernal equinox required a large, dark space like a cathedral to measure a meridian line. A hole was cut into the roof of a cathedral and using a rod or line in the floor, they measured the time it took for a noon time image of the sun to return to the same place. The accuracy depended on the quality of the laboratory set up for observation, including the location of the hole, the level of the floors and line placement. Cosimo I D’Medici a patron of the arts and supporter of the church, enlisted Egnatio Danti, a Dominican artist, for help with the calendar. Danti found the perfect location for his meridian in the Basilica di San Petronio in Bologna. Structural issues led to inaccuracy of Danti's meridian. Decades later, Giovanni Domenico Cassini, redid the meridian in the same basilica. His work resolved the apparent conflicts between Ptolemy's solar theory and Kepler's “bisection of eccentricity” using the diameter of the sun's image as an inverse substitute for the sun's distance from the earth. His precise work ended up proving the validity of Copernican theory condemned by the church. After Galileo, scientists consciously identified ways to stay in alignment with the church as much as possible.

Avoiding Conflict in Sponsorship of Scientific Research-Hermeneutical Accommodation
Astronomers from Ptolemy to Cassini recognized potential conflicts between their observations and cosmology and it was often a challenge to cultivate a position in which science and scripture could both be true. Ptolemy saw the conflict between his model and the movement of planets. By interpreting the word orbit in both a geometric sense and in a way that could apply to the sun or the earth, Catholic scientists like Cassini could create enough distance from Galileo's theory to operate without condemnation from the church. Galileo himself felt that conflict between scripture and science could be resolved through hermeneutical accommodation. He believed that there could essentially be harmony between science or nature and scripture if one understood how to interpret scripture. Galileo was of the opinion that since God is responsible for every aspect of our world, including the sensory experiences that are an integral part of scientific observation, then if what we see differs from scripture, we should conclude that the observations are correct. Galileo references Cardinal Baronius who believed that the Bible is not meant to explain heaven or God's creation as much as it is meant to guide people's actions. With that being said, Andreas Osiander was a Lutheran theologian that used Copernicus's book De revolutionibus orbium coelestium to further emphasize Copernicus's astronomical system that was already being theorized. While Osiander would be coming from a Lutheran stance and Copernicus's system was in alignment with the Catholic canon. He found that Copernicus's system also coincided with Lutheran ideologies. The part that Osiander played in counteracting the critique was by writing the foreword or rather preface of Copernicus's book to refrain it from getting questioned, within the preface he essentially alluded to the fact that Copernicus's system may be mathematically accurate and therefore would be true, but states that it is all a theory. By Osiander writing the foreword and making this statement he was  "saving the phenomenon" and was able to keep Copernicus's work from getting questioned to an extent ."Saving the phenomenon" was when scientists found reason to interpret or decode a theory in a more technical way and could further be contested with other theories. The part in which the foreword played further developed and helped bring to light the separation of both science and cosmology. Making that distinction furthered helped expand upon theories that would rub the Church in the wrong way, but avoided that because by focusing on the mathematical aspects and not making quick conclusions about how planets moved kept a boundary intact between the two and helped refrain a conflict from occurring. 

The Church has, since ancient times, been heavily involved in the study and provision of medicine. Early Christians were noted for tending the sick and infirm, and priests were often also physicians. Christian emphasis on practical charity gave rise to the development of systematic nursing and hospitals after the end of the persecution of the early church. Notable contributors to the medical sciences of those early centuries include Tertullian (born A.D. 160), Clement of Alexandria, Lactantius, and the learned St. Isidore of Seville (d. 636). St. Benedict of Nursia (480) emphasised medicine as an aid to the provision of hospitality.

During the Middle Ages, famous physicians and medical researchers included the Abbot of Monte Cassino Bertharius, the Abbot of Reichenau Walafrid Strabo, the Abbess Hildegard of Bingen, and the Bishop Marbodius of Rennes. Monasteries of this era were diligent in the study of medicine. So too, convents: Hildegard of Bingen, a doctor of the church, is among the most distinguished of Medieval Catholic women scientists. Beyond theological works, Hildegard wrote Physica, a text on the natural sciences, as well as Causae et Curae. Hildegard of Bingen was well known for her healing powers that involved practical application of tinctures, herbs, and precious stones.

Charlemagne decreed that each monastery and cathedral chapter establish a school and in these schools, medicine was commonly taught. At one such school Pope Sylvester II taught medicine. Clergy were active at the School of Salerno, the oldest medical school in Western Europe. Among the important churchmen to teach there were Alpuhans, later (1058–85) Archbishop of Salerno, and the influential Constantine of Carthage, a monk who produced superior translations of Hippocrates and investigated Arab literature.

In Catholic Spain amidst the early Reconquista, Archbishop Raimund founded an institution for translations, which employed some Jewish translators to communicate the works of Arabian medicine. Influenced by the rediscovery of Aristotelean thought, churchmen like the Dominican Albert Magnus and the Franciscan Roger Bacon made significant advances in the observation of nature.

Through the devastating Bubonic Plague, the Franciscans were notable for tending the sick. The apparent impotence of medical knowledge against the disease prompted critical examination. Medical scientists came to divide among anti-Galenists, anti-Arabists, and positive Hippocratics.  In Renaissance Italy, the Popes were often patrons of the study of anatomy, and Catholic artists such as Michelangelo advanced knowledge of the field through such studies as sketching cadavers to improve his portraits of the crucifixion.

The Jesuit order, created during the Reformation, contributed a number of distinguished medical scientists. In the field of bacteriology, Athanasius Kircher (1671) first proposed that living organisms enter and exist in the blood. In the development of ophthalmology, Christoph Scheiner made important advances about refraction of light and the retinal image.

In modern times, the Catholic Church is the largest non-government provider of health care in the world. Catholic religious have been responsible for founding and running networks of hospitals across the world where medical research continues to advance.

Pontifical Academy of Sciences

The Pontifical Academy of Sciences  was founded in 1936 by Pope Pius XI. It draws on many of the world's leading scientists, including many Nobel Laureates, to act as advisors to the Popes on scientific issues. The Academy has an international membership which includes British physicist Stephen Hawking, the astronomer royal Martin Rees, and Nobel laureates such as U.S. physicist Charles Hard Townes.

Under the protection of the reigning Pope, the Academy aims to promote the progress of the mathematical, physical, and natural sciences and the study of related epistemological problems. The Academy has its origins in the Accademia Pontificia dei Nuovi Lincei ("Pontifical Academy of the New Lynxes"), founded in 1847 and intended as a more closely supervised successor to the Accademia dei Lincei ("Academy of Lynxes") established in Rome in 1603 by the learned Roman Prince Federico Cesi (1585–1630) who was a young botanist and naturalist, and which claimed Galileo Galilei as a member.

Vatican Observatory
The Vatican Observatory (Specola Vaticana) is an astronomical research and educational institution supported by the Holy See. Originally based in Rome, it now has headquarters and laboratory at the summer residence of the Pope in Castel Gandolfo, Italy, and an observatory at the Mount Graham International Observatory in the United States. The Director of the Observatory is Brother Guy Consolmagno, SJ. Many distinguished scholars have worked at the Observatory. In 2008, the Templeton Prize was awarded to cosmologist Fr. Michał Heller, a Vatican Observatory Adjunct Scholar. In 2010, the George Van Biesbroeck Prize was awarded to former observatory director Fr. George Coyne, SJ. The current director of the Vatican Onservatory, Brother Guy Consolmagno, was awarded the American Astronomical Society's Carl Sagan Medal for Excellence in Public Communication in Planetary Science in 2014.

Jesuits

The Society of Jesus (Jesuit Order) was founded by the Spaniard Saint Ignatius Loyola in 1540. Jesuits were leaders of the Counter-Reformation, who have contributed a great many distinguished scientists and institutions of learning, right up to the present. The role of some of its members like Robert Bellarmine, in the Counter-Reformation period and in defense of Papal teaching, show the constraints under which they operated. However, recent scholarship in the history of science has focused on the substantial contributions of Jesuit scientists over the centuries. Historian Jonathan Wright discussed the breadth of Jesuit involvement in the sciences in his history of the order:
[The Jesuits] contributed to the development of pendulum clocks, pantographs, barometers, reflecting telescopes and microscopes, to scientific fields as various as magnetism, optics, and electricity. They observed, in some cases before anyone else, the colored bands on Jupiter's surface, the Andromeda nebula, and Saturn's rings. They theorized about the circulation of the blood (independently of Harvey), the theoretical possibility of flight, the way the moon affected the tides, and the wave-like nature of light. Star maps of the southern hemisphere, symbolic logic, flood-control measures on the Po and Adige rivers, introducing plus and minus signs into Italian mathematics – all were typical Jesuit achievements, and scientists as influential as Fermat, Huygens, Leibniz, and Newton were not alone in counting Jesuits among their most prized correspondents.

Jesuits in China 
The Jesuits made significant contributions to scientific knowledge in China. Under the Qing Dynasty, the Jesuits' knowledge of observational astronomy and spherical trigonometry was welcomed by the imperial court. The Manchus who conquered the Ming Dynasty also welcomed the Jesuit scientists and employed their help due to their expert knowledge of mathematical astronomy, which aided the ruling class in predicting celestial events, thus, displaying that this dynasty retained the Mandate of Heaven. In addition to reinforcing the Mandate of Heaven, the Jesuits separated two fields of science that were thought by the Chinese to be the same, cosmology and cosmography. By doing so, they were able to avoid being restricted by the Book of Changes. The Jesuits' astronomical measurements were also more accurate than their Chinese counterparts. This factor, combined with the fact that the Jesuits also sympathized with the need of the Qing Dynasty to replace the old Ming calendar with a better one of their own enabled the Jesuits to make a significant impact on the Chinese Imperial Court. The Jesuits themselves each fulfilled different roles at the imperial court. Father Matteo Ricci served on a jury charged with filling high ranking positions in the imperial court. Father Johann Adam Schall von Bell was made president of the mathematics court of the Qing dynasty and contributed significantly to the reformation of China's calendar. Father Ferdinand Verbiest contributed to China's understanding of its geography and helped China define its border with Russia.

Matteo Ricci 
Matteo Ricci was one of the most influential Jesuits that was sent to China. Matteo had been educated in math and science at the Collegio Romano with Christopher Clavius and also in Portugal at the University of Coimbra. Matteo went to China in 1581, where he resided in the city of Macau. He would then move to Beijing in 1601, where he hoped that the Ming would employ him and his order to correct their calendar. Ricci would also spread Euclidean Geometry to China by helping translate his works while using books prepared by Christopher Clavius. Ricci hoped to do this by earning the favor of the court and educated literati elites. In this, Ricci was successful. He was able to convert other Chinese scholars to Catholicism who would then subsequently help him spread both Christianity and more accurate astrological measurements. In one case, Ricci, along with Xu Guangqi and Li Zhizhao, both of whom he had converted, would translate both Euclid and Ptolemy's works into Chinese in 1607. These three would also go on to translate works from both Nicolaus Copernicus and Tycho Brahe. By doing this, they were able to introduce, however slightly new ideas into the Chinese astronomical system. Although the Ming court never took his work seriously while he was still alive, one of Ricci's converts, Xu Guangqi would later be called upon as a high-ranking member of the Ministry of Rites and he would go on to reform the Chinese astronomical system.

Johann Adam Schall von Bell 
Johann Adam Schall von Bell was another influential Jesuit priest that was sent to China. During Schall's stay in China, the Ming dynasty was overthrown and replaced by the Manchu Qing Dynasty. Schall, along with many other Jesuits quickly adapted to the regime change and offered his services to the new Qing Emperor. The new Emperor accepted Schall's offer, and this could bring in a new age of Jesuit acceptance in China that contrasted with the Ming dynasty's indifference to Matteo Ricci's efforts. The acceptance of Jesuit help would go on to have drastic consequences, as the former Chinese and Muslim members of the Astrocaldendrical Bureau who were replaced by the Jesuits would join the anti-Jesuit faction in the court and seek to purge their influence. In the meantime, however, Schall and assistants would continue their work and in 1645, they unveiled their first work. They called it a "temporal model calendar". it heavily borrowed from Mathematical Astronomy According to the New Western Methods, which was a series of Western writings that were translated into Chinese by Xu Guanqi and past Jesuits. Schall, recognizing the importance of elaborate state rituals in China, offered the calendar to the Emperor in a complex ceremony involving music, parades, and signs of submission like kneeling and kowtowing. After this overwhelming success, however, Schall's legitimacy was quickly put into question by Yang Guangxian, who accused Schall of attempting to undermine the Qing dynasty by fomenting civil unrest. Schall and the Jesuits were also accused of secretly harboring illegal foreigners in their churches spread around China and were also accused of claiming that the Qing rulers relied upon their Western ideas for political legitimacy. Schall was imprisoned and died while in captivity in 1666 at the age of seventy-five. He was posthumously pardoned by Kangxi Emperor upon his ascension to the throne.

Ferdinand Verbiest 
Ferdinand Verbiest was a Belgian Jesuit who was called upon by the Kangxi Emperor after his ascension to compete in a contest with Muslim astronomers. The contest involved predicting the length of a shadow that would pass over the imperial gnomon, which was a sundial in the Forbidden City. Verbiest won the contest and was subsequently placed at the head of the Astrocalendrical Bureau. As head of the Burea, Verbiest also shared his position with a Manchu, and this tradition would continue until the 1840s. Verbiest claimed that the studying of celestial patterns was of great practical importance to the dynasty and that whether the astronomer in question was Muslim, Jesuit or Chinese didn't matter. He argued that ensuring the observations were impartial and that applying Tycho's ideas to the observations to verify said observations were the two most important factors. Verbiest also claimed that Western ways of measuring data were the most accurate and dismissed the older findings of Chinese astronomers. While these claims did little to convince the Chinese that their old measurements were inaccurate, Verbiest's pushing of spherical trigonometry would go on to have the greatest impact on Chinese astronomy, as they saw it as being connected to when the Mongols brought Islamic astronomy to China during their conquest.

Christopher Clavius 
Christopher Clavius was one of the most prolific members of the order. During his life, he made contributions to algebra, geometry, astronomy, and cartography. Most notable of his accomplishments was his work on the reform of the Gregorian Calendar. Having taught in the Collegio Romano for 40 years, he had a direct impact on the spread of scientific knowledge within the Jesuit order and, from there, an impact on the scientific knowledge of the places his students would visit in their missionary journeys. For example, the Jesuit priest Matteo Ricci translated Clavius' books into Chinese and shared the knowledge they contained with the people of China during his missionary work there. With the help of Clavius' books, Matteo and his fellow Jesuits were able to spread the West's knowledge of astronomy to China which, in turn, led to China's refinement of its calendar system.

Athanasius Kircher 
Athanasius Kircher was a Jesuit priest who authored around 44 major works and is regarded by some scholars as the founder of Egyptology due to his study of Egyptian hieroglyphs. He is believed by many scholars to be the last "renaissance man" in light of his being a polymath and scholar of a wide range of disciplines including music, astronomy, medicine, geography, and more. Despite providing a wealth of knowledge in his books, Kircher did not contribute much in the way of scientific breakthroughs, but he is credited with the invention of the aeolian harp which was a popular instrument the 19th century One of many notable contributions Athanasius made to the world was his book, China Illustrata in which he gives a detailed record of his observations of Chinese culture and geography—including numerous detailed illustrations plants, statues, temples, and mountains in the vast landscapes of China. Kircher wrote this book based entirely on his study of documents sent back to Rome from his fellow Jesuits in China which led to Kircher being recognized as an expert in China despite having never been there himself.

Pierre Teilhard de Chardin 
Pierre Teilhard de Chardin was a Jesuit priest who took an interest in geology from a young age. After some time as a professor at the Catholic Institute of Paris, Chardin went on an expedition to China where he performed academic work concerning paleontology and geology. During his travels in China, he played a role in the discovery of the Peking Man's skull. After his research team discovered it, Chardin took part in the examination of the skull and discovered the geological time during which the Peking Man lived. During his time in China, Pierre was able to continue his research of fossils and expanded the scope of geological knowledge in Asia with the help of his fellow Jesuit, Pierre Leroy, who co-founded the Institute of Geobiology with him in Peking.

Pietro Angelo Secchi 
Pietro Angelo Secchi became a Jesuit priest in 1833. He became a professor of astronomy at the Roman College and eventually founded an observatory where he would further his research in stellar spectroscopy, meteorology, and terrestrial magnetism. His observations and theories laid the foundation for the Harvard classification system of stars as he was the first to survey the spectra of stars and attempt to classify them by their spectral type.

Jesuit Observatories 
Perhaps one of the greatest contributions made by the Jesuits to science is the large network of observatories they founded across the world. Between 1824 and 1957, 75 observatories were founded by the Jesuits. Though their main focus was astronomy, other fields the observatories were involved in include meteorology, geomagnetism, seismology, and geophysiology. In some countries in Asia and Africa, these observatories were the first scientific institutions they had ever had. The contribution of the Jesuits to the development of seismology and seismic prospecting has been so substantial that seismology has been called  "The Jesuit Science". Frederick Odenbach, SJ, is considered by many to have been the  "pioneer of American seismologists."  In 1936,  Fr. J.B. Macelwane, SJ, wrote the first seismology textbook in America, Introduction to Theoretical Seismology. In the 21st Century, Jesuits remain prominent in the sciences through institutions like the Vatican Observatory and Georgetown University.

Popes

Paul IV
For being a Protestant, Conrad Gessner's work, Historiae animalium, was put on the Index of Prohibited Books by Paul IV.

Gregory XIII
The Gregorian calendar was introduced by Gregory XIII, after whom the calendar was named, by a decree signed on 24 February 1582.

Urban VIII
Urban VIII had Galileo's book put on the Index of Prohibited Books and had Galileo sentenced to lifelong house arrest for heresy for "following the position of Copernicus, which is contrary to the true sense and authority of Holy Scripture."

Leo XIII
On 18 November 1893, Leo XIII issued Providentissimus Deus. In it, he said that "no real disagreement can exist between the theologian and the scientist provided each keeps within his own limits. ...If nevertheless there is a disagreement ... it should be remembered that the sacred writers, or more truly ‘the Spirit of God who spoke through them, did not wish to teach men such truths (as the inner structure of visible objects) which do not help anyone to salvation’; and that, for this reason, rather than trying to provide a scientific exposition of nature, they sometimes describe and treat these matters either in a somewhat figurative language or as the common manner of speech those times required, and indeed still requires nowadays in everyday life, even amongst most learned people."

Paul XI
The Pontifical Academy of Sciences was founded in 1936 by Pope Pius XI.

Pius XII
In 1939, Pius XII described Galileo as being among the "most audacious heroes of research ... not afraid of the stumbling blocks and the risks on the way, nor fearful of the funereal monuments."

In the 1950 encyclical Humani generis, Pius XII accepted evolution as a possibility (as opposed to a probability) and a legitimate field of study to investigate the origins of the human body – though it was stressed that "the Catholic faith obliges us to hold that souls are immediately created by God." In

John Paul II
John Paul II said, "faith and reason are like two wings on which the human spirit rises to the contemplation of truth; and God has placed in the human heart a desire to know the truth – in a word, to know himself – so that, by knowing and loving God, men and women may also come to the fullness of truth about themselves."

Benedict XVI
In his spiritual testament, Pope Benedict XVI said:

It often seems that science...are able to offer irrefutable results at odds with the Catholic faith...on the contrary, apparent certainties against the faith have vanished, proving to be not science, but philosophical interpretations only apparently pertaining to science;...with the succession of different generations I have seen theses that seemed unshakable collapse, proving to be mere hypotheses: the liberal generation (Harnack, Jülicher etc.), the existentialist generation (Bultmann etc.), the Marxist generation. I saw and see how out of the tangle of assumptions the reasonableness of faith emerged and emerges again.

Francis
In a July 2, 2021 video message, Pope Francis said that there "cannot and must not be any opposition between faith and science."

Current Church doctrine
In his 1893 encyclical, Pope Leo XIII wrote that "no real disagreement can exist between the theologian and the scientist provided each keeps within his own limits. ...If nevertheless there is a disagreement ... it should be remembered that the sacred writers, or more truly ‘the Spirit of God who spoke through them, did not wish to teach men such truths (as the inner structure of visible objects) which do not help anyone to salvation’; and that, for this reason, rather than trying to provide a scientific exposition of nature, they sometimes describe and treat these matters either in a somewhat figurative language or as the common manner of speech those times required, and indeed still requires nowadays in everyday life, even amongst most learned people."

The Catechism of the Catholic Church asserts: "Methodical research in all branches of knowledge, provided it is carried out in a truly scientific manner and does not override moral laws, can never conflict with the faith because the things of the world and the things of faith derive from the same God. The humble and persevering investigator of the secrets of nature is being led, as it were, by the hand of God despite himself, for it is God, the conserver of all things, who made them what they are."

Providentissimus Deus

Providentissimus Deus, "On the Study of Holy Scripture", was an encyclical issued by Pope Leo XIII on 18 November 1893. In it, he reviewed the history of Bible study from the time of the Church Fathers to the present, spoke against what he considered to be the errors of the Rationalists and "higher critics", and outlined principles of scripture study and guidelines for how scripture was to be taught in seminaries. He also addressed the issues of apparent contradictions between the Bible and physical science, or between one part of scripture and another, and how such apparent contradictions can be resolved.

Providentissimus Deus responded to two challenges to biblical authority, both of which rose during the 19th century. The physical sciences, especially the theory of evolution and geology's theory of a very old earth, challenged the traditional Biblical account of creation taking place 6,000 years ago. Pope Leo XIII wrote that true science cannot contradict scripture when it is properly explained, that errors the Church Fathers made do not demonstrate error in Scripture, and that what seems to be proved by science can turn out to be wrong.

The historical-critical method of analyzing scripture questioned the reliability of the Bible. Leo acknowledged the possibility of errors introduced by scribes but forbade the interpretation that only some of the scripture is inerrant, while other elements are fallible. Leo condemned the use that certain scholars made of new evidence, clearly referring to Alfred Firmin Loisy and Maurice d'Hulst, although not by name.

At first, both conservatives and liberals found elements in the encyclical to which to appeal. Over the next decade, however, Modernism spread and Providentissimus Deus was increasingly interpreted in a conservative sense.

This encyclical was part of an ongoing conflict between Modernists and conservatives. In 1902, Pope Leo XIII instituted the Pontifical Biblical Commission, which was to adapt Roman Catholic Biblical studies to modern scholarship and to protect Scripture against attacks. The Oath against Modernism was finally rescinded after Vatican II.

Humani generis

Humani generis is a papal encyclical that Pope Pius XII promulgated on 12 August 1950 "concerning some false opinions threatening to undermine the foundations of Catholic Doctrine." Theological opinions and doctrines are known as Nouvelle Théologie or neo-modernism and their consequences on the Church were its primary subject. Evolution and its impact on theology constitute only two out of 44 parts. Yet the position which Pius XII defined in 1950, delinking the creation of body and soul, was confirmed by Pope John Paul II, who highlighted additional facts supporting the theory of evolution half a century later.

Fides et Ratio

Fides et ratio is a Papal Encyclical that Pope John Paul II Promulgated on the 14th of September 1998, "On the Relationship between Faith and Reason". In the encyclical, Pope John Paul II addressed the relationship between faith and reason, the first to do so since Pope Leo XIII in 1879, with his encyclical Aeterni Patris. Pope John Paul II described the relationship between faith and reason as 'two wings on which the human spirit rises to the contemplation of truth'.

'This is why I make this strong and insistent appeal—not, I trust, untimely—that faith and philosophy recover the profound unity which allows them to stand in harmony with their nature without compromising their mutual autonomy. The parrhesia of faith must be matched by the boldness of reason.'

In his 1998 encyclical, Pope John Paul II gave an example to the faithful of how to defend faith, without shunning reason. Following and supporting the long tradition of Christian Theology and Philosophy. The Catholic Church has always purported a thesis of harmony between Science and Religion, despite the growing trend of conflict being purported between the two. Through Fides et ratio Pope John Paul II reinforced the Church's stance upon the relationship between Science and The Catholic Church. 'The Church remains profoundly convinced that faith and reason “mutually support each other”; each influences the other, as they offer to each other a purifying critique and a stimulus to pursue the search for deeper understanding.' 

'Similarly, fundamental theology should demonstrate the profound compatibility that exists between faith and its need to find expression by way of human reason fully free to give its assent. Faith will thus be able “to show fully the path to reason in a sincere search for the truth. Although faith, a gift of God, is not based on reason, it can certainly not dispense with it. At the same time, it becomes apparent that reason needs to be reinforced by faith, to discover horizons it cannot reach on its own”.'

Ethics and science

The Catholic Church teaches that scientific research and conduct need to be informed by and put to the aid of Christian ethics. During recent pontificates, issues such as the implications of genetics and anthropogenic climate change have been important areas of focus. The Vatican draws on leading scientists to examine scientific literature in search of "moral and philosophical problems, either caused by science or which can be helped by science."

Church and science as complementary
The Jesuit Teilhard de Chardin argued in an influential book The Phenomenon of Man (1959) that science and religion were two vital sides of the same phenomenon: a quest for perfect knowledge. Pope John Paul II in his 1998 encyclical Fides et Ratio wrote that "faith and reason are like two wings on which the human spirit rises to the contemplation of truth." In his spiritual testament, Pope Benedict XVI said:

It often seems that science...are able to offer irrefutable results at odds with the Catholic faith...on the contrary, apparent certainties against the faith have vanished, proving to be not science, but philosophical interpretations only apparently pertaining to science;...with the succession of different generations I have seen theses that seemed unshakable collapse, proving to be mere hypotheses: the liberal generation (Harnack, Jülicher etc.), the existentialist generation (Bultmann etc.), the Marxist generation. I saw and see how out of the tangle of assumptions the reasonableness of faith emerged and emerges again.

Conflict thesis and "drastic revision"
The scientists/historians John William Draper and Andrew Dickson White were the most influential exponents of the conflict thesis between the Catholic Church and science. In the early 1870s, Draper was invited to write a History of the Conflict between Religion and Science (1874), a book replying to contemporary papal edicts such as the doctrine of infallibility, and mostly criticizing the anti-intellectualism of Roman Catholicism, yet he assessed that Islam and Protestantism had little conflict with science. Draper's preface summarises the conflict thesis: "The history of Science is not a mere record of isolated discoveries; it is a narrative of the conflict of two contending powers, the expansive force of the human intellect on one side, and the compression arising from traditionary faith and human interests on the other." In 1896, White published A History of the Warfare of Science with Theology in Christendom, the culmination of thirty years of research and publication on the subject. In the introduction, White emphasized he arrived at his position after the difficulties of assisting Ezra Cornell in establishing a university without any official religious affiliation.

More recently, Thomas E. Woods, Jr., asserts that, despite the widely held conception of the Catholic Church as being anti-science, this conventional wisdom has been the subject of "drastic revision" by historians of science over the last 50 years.  Woods asserts that the mainstream view now is that the "Church [has] played a positive role in the development of science ... even if this new consensus has not yet managed to trickle down to the general public." Science historian Ronald L. Numbers corroborates this view, writing that “Historians of science have known for years that White's and Draper's accounts are more propaganda than history. …Yet the message has rarely escaped the ivory tower."

See also
 Christianity and science
 Relationship between religion and science
 Role of the Catholic Church in Western civilization
 List of Roman Catholic scientist-clerics
 List of Catholic scientists
 List of Christian thinkers in science
 List of Christian Nobel laureates
 Science and the Popes

References

Notes

Citations
 Appleby, R. Scott. Between Americanism and Modernism; John Zahm and Theistic Evolution, in Critical Issues in American Religious History: A Reader, Ed. by Robert R. Mathisen, 2nd revised edn., Baylor University Press, 2006, . Google books
 Artigas, Mariano; Glick, Thomas F.,  Martínez, Rafael A.; Negotiating Darwin: the Vatican confronts evolution, 1877-1902, JHU Press, 2006, 9780801883897, Google books
 Harrison, Brian W., Early Vatican Responses to Evolutionist Theology, Living Tradition, Organ of the Roman Theological Forum, May 2001.
 O'Leary, Don. Roman Catholicism and modern science: a history, Continuum International Publishing Group, 2006,  Google books

Further reading
 Bennett, Gaymon, Hess, Peter M. J. and others, The Evolution of Evil, Vandenhoeck & Ruprecht, 2008, Google books

  (google books)
 Küng, Hans, The beginning of all things: science and religion, trans. John Bowden, Wm. B. Eerdmans Publishing, 2007, . Google books
 
 Olson, Richard, Science and religion, 1450-1900: from Copernicus to Darwin, Greenwood Publishing Group, 2004, . Google books

External links
 Christianity and Science in Historical Perspective (from the University of Cambridge)
 Galileo Galilei, Scriptural Exegete, and the Church of Rome, Advocate of Science  lecture (audio here) by Thomas Aquinas College tutor Dr. Christopher Decaen
 "The End of the Myth of Galileo Galilei" by Atila Sinke Guimarães
 Vatican Council I (1869-70), the full documents.
 1913 Catholic Encyclopedia: Catholics and Evolution and Evolution, History and Scientific Foundation of
 
 The Vatican Palace, as a Scientific Institute, Catholic Encyclopedia, NewAdvent.org.
 
 Pope Pius XII, Humani generis, 1950 encyclical
 Roberto Masi, "The Credo of Paul VI: Theology of Original Sin and the Scientific Theory of Evolution" (L'Osservatore Romano, 17 April 1969).
 Pope John Paul II, general audience of 10 July 1985. "Proofs for God's Existence are Many and Convergent."
 Cardinal Ratzinger's Commentary on Genesis  "In the Beginning: A Catholic Understanding of the Story of Creation and the Fall".
 International Theological Commission (2004). "Communion and Stewardship: Human Persons Created in the Image of God ."
 Mark Brumley, Evolution and the Pope, of Ignatius Insight
 John L. Allen Teaching of Benedict XVI on Evolution before becoming Pope.
 Benedict XVI's inaugural address.
 Pontifical Academy of Sciences